The Waiting Game is a 1999 American comedy film directed, produced and written by Ken Liotti. It stars Will Arnett.

Premise
A group of aspiring young actors wait tables at the New York restaurant.

Cast
Will Arnett as Lenny

External links

1999 films
1999 comedy films
American comedy films
1990s English-language films
Films set in New York City
1990s American films